Thorius dubitus, commonly known as the Acultzingo pigmy salamander, is a species of salamander in the family Plethodontidae. It is endemic to Mexico where it is found in the Sierra Madre de Oaxaca of west-central Veracruz and adjacent Puebla. Its natural habitats are pine-oak cloud forests. It occurs under wood chips, logs, and rocks, and under the bark of logs and inside logs. It is threatened by habitat loss caused by logging, livestock, and subsistence agriculture.

References

Thorius
Endemic amphibians of Mexico
Fauna of the Sierra Madre de Oaxaca
Taxonomy articles created by Polbot
Amphibians described in 1941
Taxa named by Edward Harrison Taylor